Moisés Jinich Brook (15 December 1927 – 2 March 2015) was a Mexican football forward who played for Mexico in the 1954 FIFA World Cup. He also played for Atlante.

References

External links
FIFA profile

1927 births
2015 deaths
Mexico international footballers
Association football forwards
Mexican people of Croatian descent
Mexican people of Welsh descent
Atlante F.C. footballers
1954 FIFA World Cup players
Footballers from Mexico City
Mexican footballers
Liga MX players